New Lebanon is the name of several towns in the United States:

New Lebanon, Indiana
New Lebanon, Missouri
New Lebanon, New York
New Lebanon, Ohio
New Lebanon, Pennsylvania